The Sergeant is a 1910 American silent Western film directed and produced by Francis Boggs. It was written by and starred Hobart Bosworth. The film was shot on location in what was later to become Yosemite National Park in California.

The Sergeant was part of a group of 75 early American films found in New Zealand in 2010. The film was preserved by the Academy Film Archive in 2012.

Cast
 Hobart Bosworth as Sergeant Robert Adams
 Iva Shepard as Colonel Westley's Daughter
 Tom Santschi as Soldier
 Frank Clark as Soldier
 Art Acord as Indian Scout

References

External links
 
 Clips from The Sergeant (1910) at the National Film Preservation Foundation

1910 films
1910 Western (genre) films
American black-and-white films
American silent short films
Films shot in California
Selig Polyscope Company films
Surviving American silent films
Silent American Western (genre) films
1910s American films
1910s English-language films